Rebecca Bradley may refer to:

Rebecca Bradley (judge) (born 1971), American judge and current justice on the Wisconsin Supreme Court
Rebecca Bradley (novelist) (fl. 1990s–2000s), Canadian novelist and archaeologist